Verticordia sect. Jugata is one of seven sections in the subgenus Chrysoma. It includes seven species of plants in the genus Verticordia. They have sepals with fringed lobes, petals which have lobes arranged like the fingers of a hand and bracteoles which are joined together and remain attached to the flower after it opens. When Alex George reviewed the genus in 1991, he described the section and gave it the name Jugata. The name Jugata is from the Latin word jugis meaning "yoked together" referring to the arrangement of the bracteoles in these species.

The type species for this section is Verticordia chrysantha and the other six species are V. chrysanthella, V. galeata, V. brevifolia V. coronata, V. amphigia and V. laciniata.

References

Jugata
Rosids of Western Australia
Plant sections